Anni is a 1951 Indian Tamil-language film directed by K. S. Prakash Rao. The film stars Master Sethu and G. Varalakshmi.

Cast
List adapted from the database of Film News Anandan.

Male cast
Master Sethu
Master Sudhakar
K. Sivaram
Sundar Rao

Female cast
G. Varalakshmi
Annapoorna
Kamala
Saroja

Production
The film was produced and directed by K. S. Prakash Rao under the banner Prakash Productions. This was based on Sarat Chandra Chatterjee's novel 'Ramer Shumoti' (Ram Returning to Sanity).
This was debut film for two singers, Prasada Rao and M. Venu. Later, Prasada Rao was given music for the movie 'Amara Sandesam' (1954) along with Kelkar and given music independently for the movie 'Penki Pellam' (1957).
M. Venu became popular as Master Venu as a music directorTapi Dharma Rao wrote the story and M. S. Subramaniam penned the dialogues. Cinematography was done by B. S. Ranga. T. V. S. Sarma was in charge of art direction while choreography was done by Katak.

The film was produced also in Telugu with the title Dheeksha.

Soundtrack
Music was composed by Pendyala Nageswara Rao while the lyrics were penned by M. S. Subramaniam. Singer is G. Varalakshmi while the playback singers are P. Nageswara Rao, M. Satyam, M. S. Ramarao, Venkata Krishnan and M. Sarojini.

References

External links

Indian drama films
Films scored by Pendyala Nageswara Rao
1950s Tamil-language films
Films directed by K. S. Prakash Rao